Alistair Forbes Mackay (22 February 1878 – ) was a Scottish physician, biologist, and polar explorer known for being the first, along with Australians Douglas Mawson and Edgeworth David, to reach the South Magnetic Pole on 16 January 1909, during the British Antarctic Expedition of 1907–1909.

Polar exploration

British Antarctic Expedition, 1907–1909 
Mackay joined the British Antarctic Expedition of 1907–1909—led by Ernest Shackleton—as an expedition doctor. In March, along with Douglas Mawson and Edgeworth David, Mackay made up the party who undertook the first ascent of Mount Erebus.

The trek commenced on 5 October, with the men hauling their own sleds and relaying the loads which meant that every kilometre gained by the sledges involved them travelling  by foot.

For ten weeks, the men followed the coast north supplementing their stores with a diet of seals and penguins. They then crossed the Drygalski Ice Tongue and turned inland. They still faced a  return journey and established a depot to enable them to transfer their load to one overladen sled and to remove the need to relay. On 16 January 1909, they arrived at the South Magnetic Pole, took possession of the region for the British Crown. Mackay suggested three cheers for the King.

David had been appointed leader of the expedition by Shackleton, but by end January, with all three of the party experiencing severe physical deterioration, David was increasingly unable to contribute. On 31 January, with Mawson out of earshot, Mackay exerted his authority as the party's doctor and threatened to declare the professor insane unless he gave written authority of leadership to Mawson. Mawson reluctantly took command but by 30 February, he acknowledged in his diary that "the Prof was now certainly partly demented".

Canadian Arctic Expedition, 1913–1914 
Mackay was also the ship's doctor on the ill-fated Karluk expedition in 1913 led by Vilhjalmur Stefansson to explore the regions west of Parry Archipelago for the Government of Canada. After the Karluk, captained by Robert Bartlett, was stranded, crushed, and sunk by pack ice, Mackay and three other members of the crew died of exposure while struggling across the Arctic ice to reach Wrangel Island or Herald Island.

References

Footnotes

Bibliography

External links 

 Ernest Shackleton and the Nimrod expedition at Cool Antarctica

20th-century explorers
20th-century Scottish medical doctors
1878 births
1914 deaths
Alumni of the University of Dundee
Alumni of the University of Edinburgh
Explorers of Antarctica
Explorers of the Arctic
Naval surgeons
Recipients of the Polar Medal
Royal Navy Medical Service officers
Scottish biologists
Scottish polar explorers
Shipwreck survivors
British Army personnel of the Second Boer War